The 2021–22 Michigan Tech Huskies men's ice hockey season was the 101st season of play for the program and 4th in the Central Collegiate Hockey Association (CCHA). They represented Michigan Technological University, played their home games at MacInnes Student Ice Arena and were coached by Joe Shawhan, in his 5th season.

Season
Michigan Tech joined with six other members of the WCHA to restart the CCHA for the 2021–22 season. The Huskies had a rocky start to their season; after sweeping their first weekend, the team lost at least one game in each of the next five weeks. While their opposition was nothing to sneeze at, Tech was unable to distance itself from the crowd and subsequently fell out of the polls. The cause for their inconsistent play was just as mercurial; some times the offense would not be able to get on track while at other times the goaltending wasn't quite up to par. One thing that did carry over from game to game was the defense, which did a tremendous job limiting the opposition's chances to the tune of less than 22 shots a game.

Near the end of November the Huskies looked to be getting themselves in order when they swept two weekends sandwiched around a losing effort against Minnesota State. The improvement in their play enabled the team to get back into the polls and remain there even after a less-than-stellar Great Lakes Invitational.

Tech was limited to just 4 games in January, due to positive COVID-19 tests around the college hockey landscape, but the team used its time off to great effect and went on a winning streak when they finally got back onto the ice. Michigan Tech went 8–0–1 through mid-February and rose up to 14 in the polls. More importantly, the team got into the top 10 in the PairWise rankings, which would guarantee them a spot in the NCAA tournament. The strong play in the second half also put the Huskies in a position to win the regular season crown if it could sweep its final four games, however, after going into overtime twice against Ferris State, their longshot hopes were dashed.

In the first CCHA tournament in 9 years, the Huskies were again pressed by Ferris State, needing overtime in both contests. Their special teams play saved their season as MTU scored 2 power play goals, 1 shorthanded goal and on a penalty shot. Their offense continued to sputter in the semifinal but they were also let down by a defensive breakdown in the third that saw Bemidji State score three times in under 5 minutes. The loss dropped the Huskies to 12 in the PairWise but that was well within the margin for at-large teams and Tech made it back to the tournament for the first time in four years.

NCAA tournament
The Huskies received a #3 seed for the tournament but were a sizable underdog to Minnesota Duluth, who were coming off of their 4th-consecutive Frozen Four. Their chances in the game were dealt a serious blow just 3 minutes into the game when their leading scorer, and Hobey Baker Award finalist, Brian Halonen received a controversial major penalty for boarding and was ejected from the game. Afterwards the offense was never able to get on track; while Tech got several shots on goal, few were high-level scoring chances and the team were held off by a very strong Bulldog defense. The only saving grace for MTU was that Pietila kept them in the game and the Huskies were still just one shot away from tying the score entering the third period. As the offense tried to rise to the occasion, Eric Gotz lost the puck on a pass up the ice and the turnover was immediately fired into the Tech goal. The second Duluth goal took most of the energy out of the Huskies. While they did try to claw their way back late, they could never get the puck past Ryan Fanti and an empty-netter sealed their fate.

Departures

Recruiting

Roster
As of August 30, 2021.

Standings

Schedule and results

|-
!colspan=12 style=";" | Exhibition

|-
!colspan=12 style=";" | Regular season

|-
!colspan=12 style=";" | 

|-
!colspan=12 style=";" | Regular season

|-
!colspan=12 style=";" | 

|-
!colspan=12 style=";" |

Scoring statistics

Goaltending statistics

Rankings

Note: USCHO did not release a poll in week 24.

Awards and honors

References

2021–22
Michigan Tech Huskies
Michigan Tech Huskies
Michigan Tech Huskies
Michigan Tech Huskies